The 2017–18 Ohio Bobcats men's basketball team represented Ohio University during the 2017–18 NCAA Division I men's basketball season. The Bobcats, led by fourth-year head coach Saul Phillips, played their home games at the Convocation Center in Athens, Ohio as a member of the East Division of the Mid-American Conference. They finished the season 14–17, 7–11 in MAC play to finish in a tie for fourth place in the East Division. They lost in the first round of the MAC tournament to Miami (OH).

Roster

Preseason
The preseason poll and league awards were announced by the league office on October 26, 2017.  Ohio was picked to finish fourth in the MAC East. Jordan Dartis and Jason Carter were both on the Preseason All-MAC East team.

Preseason men's basketball poll
(First place votes in parenthesis)

East Division
 Buffalo 166 (24)
 Kent State 139 (2)
 Ohio 127 (3)
 Akron 84 (1)
 Bowling Green 82
 Miami 32

West Division
 Western Michigan 169 (22)
 Ball State 156 (8)
 Toledo 107
 Eastern Michigan 103
 Northern Illinois 57
 Central Michigan 38

Tournament champs
Western Michigan (10), Buffalo (9), Ball State (5), Kent State (2), Toledo (2), Bowling Green (1), Miami (1)

Preseason All-MAC 

Source

Previous season

The Bobcats finished the 2016–17 season 20–10, 11–7 in MAC play to finish in a tie for second place in the East Division. As the No. 2 seed in the MAC tournament, they defeated Toledo before losing to eventual tournament champion Kent State in the semifinals.

Schedule and results

|-
!colspan=9 style=| Exhibition 

|-
!colspan=9 style=| Non-conference regular season

|-
!colspan=9 style=| MAC regular season

|-
!colspan=9 style=| MAC Tournament

Statistics

Team Statistics
Final 2017–18 Statistics

Source

Player statistics

Source

Awards and honors

All-MAC Awards 

Source

See also
 2017–18 Ohio Bobcats women's basketball team

References

Ohio
Ohio Bobcats men's basketball seasons
Ohio Bobcats men's basketball
2017 in sports in Ohio